Hussein ("Hussy") Hussein (born 29 September 1975)) is an Australian former professional boxer who competed from 1998 to 2008. He challenged for the WBC flyweight title in 2003 and the interim WBC flyweight title in 2005. As an amateur, he represented his country at the 1994 Commonwealth Games in Victoria, British Columbia, Canada and at the 1996 Summer Olympics in Atlanta, Georgia, where he was beaten in the second round of the men's flyweight division (– 51 kg) by Ireland's Damaen Kelly.

Hussein Hussein was inducted into the Australian National Boxing Hall of Fame Moderns category in 2022.

He was an Australian Institute of Sport scholarship holder. His amateur record was 84–17.

He turned professional with Jeff Fenech in 1998 and was ranked no. 1 in the world in the flyweight division. Fought for the WBC world flyweight title against Pongsaklek Wonjongkam in Bangkok Thailand in 2003. Lost on points. He also fought against 3 division world champion Jorge Arce in 2005 and lost in the 10th round, was a candidate for ESPN fight of the year.

After retirement Hussein Hussein is a boxing trainer along with his brothers Billy Hussein and Maz Hussein at the Bodypunch Boxing Gym in Lakemba Sydney Australia.

References

External links
 
 sports-reference

1975 births
Living people
Boxers at the 1996 Summer Olympics
Olympic boxers of Australia
Australian Institute of Sport boxers
Boxers from Sydney
Australian male boxers
Flyweight boxers
Boxers at the 1994 Commonwealth Games
Commonwealth Games competitors for Australia